The 1978 European Championship can refer to European Championships held in several sports:

 1978 European Rugby League Championship
 1978 European Championships in Athletics